Tuzigoot National Monument (Western Apache: Tú Digiz) preserves a 2- to 3-story pueblo ruin on the summit of a limestone and sandstone ridge just east of Clarkdale, Arizona,  above the Verde River floodplain. The Tuzigoot Site is an elongated complex of stone masonry rooms that were built along the spine of a natural outcrop in the Verde Valley. The central rooms stand higher than the others and they appear to have served public functions. The pueblo has 110 rooms.

″Tú Digiz/Tuzigoot″ is a Tonto Apache term for "crooked waters," from nearby Pecks Lake, a cutoff meander of the Verde River; from Tú Digiz one principal Tonto Apache clan gets its name. The pueblo was built by the Sinagua people between 1125 and 1400 CE. Tuzigoot is the largest and best preserved of the many Sinagua pueblo ruins in the Verde Valley. The ruins at Tuzigoot incorporate very few doors; instead, the inhabitants used ladders accessed by trapdoor type openings in the roofs to enter each room.

The monument is on land once owned by United Verde/Phelps Dodge. The corporation sold the site to Yavapai County for $1 so that the excavation could be completed under the auspices of federal relief projects. The county in turn transferred the land to the federal government.

Tuzigoot was excavated from 1933 to 1935 by Louis Caywood and Edward Spicer of the University of Arizona, with funding from the federal Civil Works Administration and Works Project Administration. In 1935–1936, with additional federal funding, the ruins were prepared for public display, and a Pueblo Revival-style museum and visitor center was constructed.

Franklin D. Roosevelt designated Tuzigoot Ruins as a U.S. National Monument on July 25, 1939.  The Tuzigoot National Monument Archeological District was listed on the National Register of Historic Places on October 15, 1966.

The ruins are surrounded by the tailings pond of the former United Verde copper mine at Jerome. The tailings have recently been stabilized and revegetated.

Climate
Tuzigoot National Monument has a semi-arid climate (Köppen: BSk) with cool winters and very hot summers.

Gallery

See also
 National Register of Historic Places listings in Yavapai County, Arizona
 List of historic properties in Clarkdale, Arizona
 List of national monuments of the United States

References

External links

 
 
 
  

National Park Service National Monuments in Arizona
Archaeological sites in Arizona
Archaeological museums in Arizona
Museums in Yavapai County, Arizona
Native American museums in Arizona
Ancient Puebloan archaeological sites in Arizona
Archaeological sites on the National Register of Historic Places in Arizona
National Register of Historic Places in Yavapai County, Arizona
Protected areas of the Sonoran Desert
Protected areas of Yavapai County, Arizona
Former populated places in Yavapai County, Arizona
Ruins in the United States
1939 establishments in Arizona
Protected areas established in 1939
Sinagua